Haplochromis chromogynos is a species of cichlid endemic to Lake Victoria.  This species grows to a length of  SL.

References

chromogynos
Fish described in 1959
Taxa named by Humphry Greenwood
Taxonomy articles created by Polbot